Vicky Exley (born 22 October 1975) is an English former international footballer from Rotherham in South Yorkshire. She most recently played for Doncaster Rovers Belles in the FA WSL, the top division of women's football in England. Exley also played over 50 times for England's national team.

Club career
Exley joined Sheffield Wednesday Ladies at the age of 15, moving to Doncaster Rovers Belles three years later. She began her Belles career as a striker before switching back to a midfield playmaker role. Nicknamed Tricky, Exley is renowned for her powerful shot.

Despite scoring with a header, Exley was on the losing side in the 2000 FA Women's Cup final, as Croydon won 2–1. Two years later Exley featured in another Cup final defeat, this time to professional Fulham.

In 2004 Doncaster Belles suffered an exodus of players after a financial crisis, however, Exley and Claire Utley chose to remain loyal to the club. In September 2004, Exley scored after four seconds of a League Cup tie against Aston Villa from inside her own half. During that 2004–05 season, Doncaster struggled and only retained their National Premier League status thanks to Exley scoring on the final day of the season. Exley was top scorer for Doncaster Belles in the following two seasons, winning the manager's Player of the Year award in 2006.

In July 2008, Exley scored the only goal of the game as Doncaster beat Watford Ladies in the FA Futsal Women's Cup, the competition being the first time that Doncaster had played Futsal.

Exley scored 25 goals in all competitions during 2009–10 and was named in the Belles' 2011 FA WSL squad. She netted Doncaster's first goal in the new league, the winner at Lincoln Ladies' Sincil Bank on the opening night.

Prior to the 2012 season Exley was released by Doncaster. In explaining his decision, manager John Buckley paid his own tribute, telling the Doncaster Free Press:

In May 2012 it was reported that Exley had decided to retire from football altogether. In June 2012 Exley served as a torch bearer in the 2012 Summer Olympics torch relay, as recognition for her services to playing and coaching football.

International career
Following her March 1996 debut, a 2–1 defeat in Italy, Exley played a total of 52 times for England. In September 2004 Exley captained England for the first time, marking the occasion with a goal in a 2–1 friendly win over the Netherlands. She appeared in the 2007 World Cup, scoring a penalty in the final group-stage game against Argentina. Exley then announced her retirement from international football in November 2007, stating her desire to go into coaching.

International goals
Scores and results list England's goal tally first.

Personal life
Exley supports Sheffield Wednesday and works as a postwoman.

References

External links
Vicky Exley at Doncaster Rovers Belles

1975 births
Living people
English women's footballers
England women's international footballers
Doncaster Rovers Belles L.F.C. players
FA Women's National League players
Footballers from Rotherham
Women's association football midfielders
2007 FIFA Women's World Cup players